The Gemini astronauts were sixteen pilots who flew in Project Gemini, NASA's second human spaceflight program, between projects Mercury and Apollo.  Carrying two astronauts at a time, a senior command pilot and a junior pilot, the Gemini spacecraft was used for ten crewed missions.  Four of the sixteen astronauts flew twice.

Gemini was the second phase in the United States space program's larger goal of "landing a man on the Moon and returning him safely to the Earth" before the end of the 1960s, as proposed by president John F. Kennedy.  As an intermediary step, Gemini afforded its astronauts the opportunity to gain critical spaceflight experience, performing tasks required in the later Apollo program which fulfilled this objective.  Such tasks included rendezvous or station-keeping with other craft, docking, habitation in space over the course of several days, and flying spacecraft with more than one crew member.  Importantly, most individuals who flew as Gemini astronauts returned to space as key personnel in the Apollo program, bringing with them their first-hand experience of the operations carried out during Gemini.  Among the Gemini astronauts, six later walked on the Moon, another five flew to the Moon without landing, and two participated in Low Earth orbit Apollo missions.  Gus Grissom and Ed White were killed in the Apollo 1 disaster, and former Mercury astronaut Gordon Cooper did not perform any further spaceflights.

All Gemini astronauts–excluding the Mercury Seven astronauts already included–were inducted into the U.S. Astronaut Hall of Fame in 1993.

Astronaut participation in Project Gemini was also a strong predictor for future achievement during the Apollo Program:

 Every Apollo mission commander, including Gus Grissom and with the exception of Alan Shepard, was a Gemini veteran.
 All three crew members of Apollo 11, the first lunar landing-Neil Armstrong, Michael Collins and Buzz Aldrin-were Gemini veterans.
 All three of the men who flew to the Moon twice-Jim Lovell, John Young and Gene Cernan-were Gemini veterans.
 With the exception of Elliot See, every member of NASA's second Astronaut Group—the class of nine men selected following the Mercury Seven—flew as a Gemini astronaut.

Key

Notes

References

Astronauts by space program
Gemini
Project Gemini astronauts